Tomme Vaudoise is a Swiss soft cheese from the French part of Switzerland. It is a soft, unpasteurised cows' milk cheese from the cantons of Vaud and Geneva.

See also
Culinary Heritage of Switzerland
List of Swiss cheeses

References

External links
 http://culturecheesemag.com/cheese-library/tomme-vaudoise

Swiss cheeses
Canton of Vaud
Cow's-milk cheeses
Culinary Heritage of Switzerland